Di may refer to:
Kho'ini dialect of Iran
Ding language of Congo